During the 2014–15 season, Vitesse Arnhem participated in the Eredivisie and the KNVB Cup. Despite performing well in the previous season, the club failed to qualify for any major European competition.

Players

Squad details

Transfers

In

Total spending:  €500,000

Out

Total gaining:  €0

Competition

Eredivisie

League table

Matches

KNVB Cup

Play-offs 
Play-offs for a spot in the 2015–16 UEFA Europa League third qualifying round; Vitesse wins the play-offs.

Friendlies

Pre-season

2015

References

External links 
Vitesse Official Website 
UEFA Website

Dutch football clubs 2014–15 season
SBV Vitesse seasons